The Atlantic Express and Pacific Express were a pair of Erie Railroad passenger trains which together provided round-trip service between the New York City area and Chicago, Illinois. They were the Erie's oldest named passenger trains, having been named in 1885 and discontinued in 1965 under the Erie Lackawanna Railway, successor to the Erie. Specifically, the train originated at the Erie Railroad's Pavonia Terminal in Jersey City, New Jersey until 1956. For the last nine years the train began at the Delaware, Lackawanna and Western's Hoboken Terminal in Hoboken, New Jersey. For the last five years the train was an Erie Lackawanna Railroad train, as the Erie and the Lackawanna railroads merged in 1960. It was the last long distance passenger train to run along the Erie Main Line.

References 

Passenger rail transportation in Illinois
Passenger rail transportation in Indiana
Passenger rail transportation in New Jersey
Passenger rail transportation in New York (state)
Passenger rail transportation in Ohio
Passenger rail transportation in Pennsylvania
Passenger trains of the Erie Railroad
Passenger trains of the Erie Lackawanna Railway
Named passenger trains of the United States
Night trains of the United States
Railway services introduced in 1885
Railway services discontinued in 1965